Phillip LaMarr (born January 24, 1967) is an American actor, comedian and screenwriter. He was one of the original featured cast members on the sketch comedy television series Mad TV, where he stayed for five seasons. His voice acting roles in animated series include John Stewart / Green Lantern in Justice League and Justice League Unlimited, Hermes Conrad in Futurama, the title characters of Samurai Jack and Static Shock, and Wilt in Foster's Home for Imaginary Friends. LaMarr has also provided voices for video game franchises including Metal Gear, Jak and Daxter, Darksiders, Final Fantasy, Infamous, Dead Island, Kingdom Hearts, and Mortal Kombat. He also played as Browntooth the Goblin rogue in a Critical Role One-Shot "The Goblins".

In film, he played Marvin in Pulp Fiction. He also appeared in Kill the Man, Free Enterprise, Cherish, and Manna from Heaven.

Early life
LaMarr was born in Los Angeles. He is a graduate of the Harvard-Westlake School in North Hollywood and Yale University, where he helped found the improv comedy group Purple Crayon. One of his biggest roles at Yale was the titular character in the British comedy Trevor. After graduating in 1989, he became a member of the award-winning sketch and improv comedy group The Groundlings. He studied improv at The Second City and at the ImprovOlympic in Chicago with Del Close. He has also improvised with Cold Tofu and Off the Wall.

Career

Mad TV
LaMarr, unlike most of the other original nine cast members of Mad TV, had extensive television and film jobs experience when he joined the show (as did fellow cast member David Herman). Even before college, he had voiced a character on the Mister T cartoon show.

Some of the recurring characters LaMarr performed on Mad TV were Desperation Lee ("Funky Walker Dirty Talker"), Jaq the UBS Guy, "sexy player" Rick, talentless R&B singer Savante, and Rocket Revengers star Lieutenant Abraham Jefferson (a.k.a. Lincoln Willis).

LaMarr has done impressions of the following celebrities:

 Bobby Brown
 Ray Charles
 Johnnie Cochran
 Nat King Cole
 Billy Crystal (as Harry Burns from When Harry Met Sally...)
 Diddy
 Tommy Davidson
 Sammy Davis Jr.
 Louis Farrakhan
 Morgan Freeman
 Sherman Hemsley (as George Jefferson from The Jeffersons)
 Ice-T
 Michael Jackson
 Rick James
 Vernon Jordan
 Don King
 Martin Lawrence
 Spike Lee
 Bill Maher
 Howard McNear (as Floyd Lawson from The Andy Griffith Show)
 Eddie Murphy
 Sidney Poitier
 Colin Powell
 Prince
 Chris Rock
 Bernard Shaw
 Sinbad
 Sammy Sosa
 Chris Tucker
 Ben Vereen
 Kanye West
 Barry White
 Michael Winslow
 Stevie Wonder

He has also done impressions of Moe Howard from The Three Stooges while playing an African-American version of the character.

LaMarr left Mad TV at the end of the fifth season (2000).

Sometimes, LaMarr fills in for Greg Proops on the Odd News small, a 4-minute section on Yahoo.com. It features odd but true recent news.

Since July 1, 2020, LaMarr has hosted NASA tv's "Ask the Astronomers live!" show.

Voice acting work
LaMarr's voice over credits include a starring role on Justice League and Justice League Unlimited as John Stewart/Green Lantern, a major role as Hermes Conrad and various other characters on Futurama, and the title roles on Samurai Jack and Static Shock. Besides this he also voiced Black Vulcan in Harvey Birdman, Attorney at Law and Hector Con Carne in Evil Con Carne. LaMarr reprised his role as Hermes Conrad in the Futurama films Bender's Big Score, The Beast with a Billion Backs, Bender's Game, Into the Wild Green Yonder, and upon the series return in 2010. He also voices Wilt and other recurring characters in Foster's Home for Imaginary Friends, Carver Descartes on The Weekenders, Philly Phil in Class of 3000, and he portrayed the character Osmosis Jones in the television series Ozzy & Drix (replacing Chris Rock). He was also Gabe Wallace, and other characters in Kaijudo: Rise of the Duel Masters. He additionally voices Jazz, Omega Supreme, Oil Slick, and Jetstorm on Transformers Animated. LaMarr portrayed Nautolan Jedi Master Kit Fisto in Star Wars : The Clone Wars on Cartoon Network; he also played Amit Noloff, a one time character, and a Tactical Droid. He portrayed Aquaman, and voiced other characters in Young Justice, and he voiced Baxter Stockman in the 2012 Teenage Mutant Ninja Turtles. He also lent his voice to the character of Lucius Fox for DC Super Hero Girls. LaMarr also provided voice talent to J.A.R.V.I.S. throughout the series of The Avengers: Earth's Mightiest Heroes. He also portrayed Professor Thistlethorpe, a caterpillar, in Bojack Horseman. Through a tweet Jar Jar Binks actor, Ahmed Best, implied that LaMarr had done the voice work for his character on the animated show The Clone Wars. LaMarr provided the voice of Alphabittle the unicorn in the Netflix animated film My Little Pony: A New Generation. LaMarr was also the voice of the US Sega Saturn mascot "Swayzak" (unofficial name.)

In July 2021, LaMarr provided the voice for Orn Free Taa in Star Wars: The Bad Batch.

Film and theatre projects

LaMarr's stage credits include The Tempest, As You Like It, Guys and Dolls, Asylum, South Coast Repertory's Make the Break and the Sacred Fools Theater Company's inaugural production of The Fatty Arbuckle Spookhouse Revue.

LaMarr's second film role was that of the ill-fated Marvin from Pulp Fiction. He has appeared in Kill the Man, Free Enterprise, Cherish, and Manna from Heaven. He appeared in Speaking of Sex starring Bill Murray and Catherine O'Hara, and Back by Midnight with Kirstie Alley, Rodney Dangerfield, and Randy Quaid.

LaMarr's recent film appearances include Fronterz (2004) and Choose Your Own Adventure: The Abominable Snowman (2005). As of April 2006, LaMarr is filming Cook Off!, in which he will appear as Rev. Thaddeus Briggs, Esq.

LaMarr made a cameo appearance in the Will Ferrell film Step Brothers in which he is viewing a house for sale with his wife.

LaMarr also was in the Yum Corp Sexual Harassment training videos.

LaMarr played Cowboy Curtis in the Los Angeles and Broadway productions of The Pee-wee Herman Show. The LA production ran from January 12 to February 7, 2010, at the Club Nokia @ LA Live. The New York show opened on November 11 and ended its limited engagement on January 2, 2011. The New York production was recorded for an HBO special that aired in March 2011.

LaMarr also appeared in Spider-Man 2 as one of the riders standing behind Spider-Man in the subway train as he was trying to save the train.

Video game voiceover work

LaMarr performed the English voice-over work for Vamp, a villain of Metal Gear Solid 2: Sons of Liberty and Metal Gear Solid 4: Guns of the Patriots. Additionally, LaMarr voiced the characters Reddas from Square Enix's Final Fantasy XII as well as Ramza in the PSP version of Final Fantasy Tactics: The War of the Lions. He also did several voices for Vampire: The Masquerade – Bloodlines.

He also did the English voice acting for the parts of Sig and Count Veger in the Jak and Daxter video game series as well as voicing several characters in the game Marvel: Ultimate Alliance, as well as the voice of Gadon Thek in Star Wars: Knights of the Old Republic. As well as a featuring in the Sega CD game Make My Video C+C Music Factory, he also was the voice of Chris Jacobs in both Mercenaries: Playground of Destruction and its sequel, Mercenaries 2: World in Flames. He plays the character John White/The Beast in the PS3 titles Infamous and Infamous 2. Also, he plays the character Dr. Bradley Ragland in the game Prototype.

He also was the voice of the grumpy Kane in the game The Legend of Spyro: A New Beginning, and Marty in the video game tie-in of Madagascar. LaMarr also voiced the merchant "Vulgrim" in the action/adventure hybrid Darksiders.

He played the role of "Mr. Sunshine" in the 2008 crime game Saints Row 2, and reprised his role in Saints Row IV in 2013.

He reprised his role as Kit Fisto for the video game: Star Wars: The Clone Wars - Republic Heroes. LaMarr voiced Rick Grimes in the animation film of The Walking Dead.

He also voiced Sam B, one of the playable characters in Dead Island, and recently made his debut in the Kingdom Hearts series in Kingdom Hearts 3D: Dream Drop Distance as Phoebus, a character originally from The Hunchback of Notre Dame and voiced by Kevin Kline.

LaMarr returned to the Metal Gear franchise as the voice of Kevin Washington in Metal Gear Rising: Revengeance.

He also provided the voice for multiple roles in Hunt the Truth, a marketing campaign audio-drama for Halo 5: Guardians.

LaMarr provided the voices of Aquaman and John Stewart (Green Lantern) in the 2013 superhero fighting video game Injustice: Gods Among Us and its 2017 sequel, Injustice 2.

LaMarr, in addition, provided his voice for a number of audio logs in 2016 puzzle game, The Witness.
He also voiced Kotal Kahn in Mortal Kombat X (2015) and Mortal Kombat 11 (2019).

Webisode project
LaMarr had been announced to appear as a regular character in a webisode series, Naught for Hire produced by Jeffrey Berman and Ben Browder (Farscape), that has been in development since 2010. His character Mark One was described to be that of an elevator with mood swings. It is unclear whether or not he will be solely the voice of this character or if he will appear in person similar to that of Max Headroom, a concept which Browder has pulled from before when writing for Farscape episode "John Quixote", which used an elevator displaying a talking human interface on a screen within.

Kickstarter
LaMarr is working on co-creating and voice-acting in a project titled Goblins Animated. The Kickstarter launched on October 23, 2017, and finished on November 22, 2017. LaMarr is working with Ellipsis Stephens, Danielle Stephens, and Matt King to produce the cartoon. Voice actors on board are Billy West, Maurice LaMarche, Jim Cummings, Matthew Mercer and Steve Blum.

Filmography

Live-action

Film

Television

Voice roles

Film

Television

Video games

Web series

Audio plays

Awards and nominations

Notes

References

External links

 
 
 
 
 An Audio Interview with Phil LaMarr by SiDEBAR
 Phil LaMarr Interview w/ Legions of Gotham
 

1967 births
Living people
African-American male actors
African-American male comedians
American impressionists (entertainers)
American male child actors
American male comedians
American male film actors
American male television actors
American male video game actors
American male voice actors
American sketch comedians
American television writers
Cartoon Network people
Comedians from California
Harvard-Westlake School alumni
Inkpot Award winners
Male actors from Los Angeles
Yale University alumni
20th-century African-American people
21st-century African-American people
20th-century American comedians
21st-century American comedians
20th-century American male actors
21st-century American male actors